Brett Harrell (born July 1, 1961) is an American former politician from Georgia. Harrell was a Republican member of the Georgia House of Representatives from the 106th District, serving from 2011 to 2021. Harrell sponsored 206 bills. Harrell served as the mayor of Snellville, Georgia, from 2000 to 2003.

References

External links 
 Brett Harrell at ballotpedia.org
 Brett Harrell at ourcampaigns.com

Living people
Republican Party members of the Georgia House of Representatives
Mayors of places in Georgia (U.S. state)
People from Snellville, Georgia
21st-century American politicians
1961 births